The 1971–72 Essex Senior Football League season was the first in the history of Essex Senior Football League, a football competition in England.

Clubs

The league was formed by nine clubs.
Clubs joined from the Essex and Suffolk Border League:
Heybridge Swifts
Tiptree United
Witham Town
Clubs joined from the Herts Senior County League:
Saffron Walden Town
Stansted
Plus:
Basildon United, joined from the Greater London League
Billericay Town, joined from the Essex Olympian League
Pegasus Athletic
Southend United 'A'

League table

References

Essex Senior Football League seasons
1971–72 in English football leagues